The Tumby Bay District Council is a local government area of South Australia covering an area of the North Eastern Eyre Peninsula. It was established in 1906, only six years after the town of Tumby Bay was established, when the district was severed from the former District Council of Lincoln (now the District Council of Lower Eyre Peninsula) to form the present council.

Localities

The district encompasses a number of towns and localities, including Brooker, Butler, Cockaleechie, Koppio, Lipson, Moody, Port Neill, Tumby Bay, Ungarra, Yallunda Flat and part of Hincks.

Economy
The District's economy relies heavily on agriculture and fishing, and to a lesser extent, tourism.

The Area has long been a tourist destination, with fishing being a major attraction. A large marina was constructed in Tumby Bay in 2001, which has allowed for easier launching of boats, as well as development of nearby areas.

Councillors

Chairmen and mayors of Tumby Bay

 James Kintore Schramm (1934–1964) 
 William Robert Pfitzner (1964–1968) 
 Kenneth Howard Ware (1968–1976) 
 Colin Fergus Chilman (1977–1983) 
 Ian James Whiting Pearson (1983–?)

References

External links
District Council of Tumby Bay

Tumby Bay, District Council of
Eyre Peninsula